Horace is a crater on Mercury.  Its name was adopted by the International Astronomical Union (IAU) in 1976. Horace is named for the Ancient Roman poet Horace, who lived from 65 BCE to 8 BCE.

To the west of Horace is the crater Spitteler, and to the north is Puccini.

References

Impact craters on Mercury